Elvira Dyangani Ose (born in 1974) is an art curator. Her family comes from Equatorial Guinea, and Dyangani Ose was born and raised in Spain. She is the director of MACBA Contemporary Art Museum in Barcelona. From 2018 to 2021, she has been director and chief curator at The Showroom gallery, London.

Education 
Dyangani Ose obtained her Bachelor of Arts degree in Art History from the Universitat Autònoma de Barcelona.  While she was studying in Barcelona, her professor encouraged her to exhibit; during the 1990s, she began creating pop-up exhibitions with her fellow students. These exhibitions featured young urban artists working out of the mainstream.

She subsequently received her Master of Advanced Studies degree in Theory and History of Architecture from the Universitat Politècnica de Catalunya (Barcelona) and a Master of Arts in History of Art and Visual Studies from Cornell University. Dyangani Ose also obtained her P.h.D. in History of Art and Visual Studies from Cornell University.

Museum and curatorial work 
From 2004 to 2006, Dyangani Ose was a curator at the Centro Atlántico de Arte Moderno. In 2006, she curated the Olvida Quien Soy/ Erase Me From Who I Am exhibition, which featured works from Nicholas Hlobo, Zanele Muholi, Moshekwa Langa, and others. The exhibition focused on issues of representation. She also curated projects by Alfredo Jaar, Lara Almárcegui, and Ábalos & Herreros. 

From 2006 to 2008, Ose was a curator at the Centro Andaluz de Arte Contemporáneo. From 2007 to 2008, she curated the interdisciplinary project Attempt to Exhaust an African Place.

From 2009 to 2010, Ose curated Arte Invisible. In 2010, she also curated Carrie Mae Weems: Social Studies, as well as being guest curator of triennial SUD-Salon Urbain de Douala.

In 2011, Ose joined the Tate Museum, where she worked closely with the African Acquisitions Committee and developed the museum's holdings relating to the African Diaspora. This position was supported by the Guaranty Trust Bank of Nigeria.

From 2012 to 2014, Ose was responsible for the Across the Board project, which was an interdisciplinary project in London, Accra, Douala, and Lagos. She also co-curated the 2013 exhibit, Ibrahim al-Salahi: A Visionary Modernist. During 2013, she was also the Artistic Director for the third edition of Rencontres Picha. Guaranty Trust Bank.

On 28 June 2014, Ose was named curator of the eighth edition of Göteborg International Biennial for Contemporary Art (GIBCA).

On 10 February 2017, Ose was named Senior Curator at Creative Time. She was appointed Director of The Showroom gallery, London, in 2018.

From 2018 to 2021, she has been director and chief curator at The Showroom gallery, London. She took over as director of MACBA in 2021.

Lectures and publications 
Ose has lectured on modern and contemporary African art. She has been published in Nka and Atlántica.

References

1974 births
Living people
Autonomous University of Barcelona alumni
Cornell University alumni
African art curators
Spanish people of Equatoguinean descent
Spanish art curators
Spanish women curators